Jess Olson (born January 29, 1985) is an American politician and a Republican Representative of the South Dakota House of Representatives representing District 34 since January 2019.

Early life and education
Jess Olson was born in Rapid City, South Dakota. She attended Dartmouth College where she received her B.A. in English Literature. She then completed her master's degree in Healthcare Administration at the University of North Carolina-Chapel Hill in 2011.

Healthcare career
Olson graduated from the Gillings School of Global Public Health at the University of North Carolina-Chapel Hill in 2011. She served as executive director for  Wellfully, a non-profit behavioral healthcare organization serving at-risk youth from 2012 to 2018. In 2019, she launched a home health company, Stay Graceful, Inc.

Political career
In the four-way November 6, 2018 General election, Olson took the first seat with 5,853 votes (32%) and Representative Michael Diedrich took the second seat ahead of Democratic candidates George Nelson and Brian Davis.

References

1985 births
Living people
21st-century American women politicians
Dartmouth College alumni
UNC Gillings School of Global Public Health alumni
South Dakota Republicans
Politicians from Rapid City, South Dakota
21st-century American politicians
Women state legislators in South Dakota